Gilberts is a name for the Gilbert Islands in the Pacific Ocean.

Gilberts may also refer to:

 Gilberts, California, an unincorporated community in the United States 
 Gilberts, Illinois, a village in Kane County, Illinois, United States

See also
 Gilbert (disambiguation)